General Maxwell may refer to:

Charles William Maxwell (1775–1848), British Army lieutenant general
David W. Maxwell (fl. 1980s–2020s), U.S. Marine Corps major general
Francis Aylmer Maxwell (1871–1917), British Army brigadier general
John Maxwell (British Army officer) (1859–1929), British Army general
Russell Maxwell (1890–1968), U.S. Army major general
Thomas Maxwell (Jacobite) (d. 1693), Scottish-born French Army major general
William Maxwell (Continental Army general) (1733–1796), Ulster-born Continental Army brigadier general

See also
Attorney General Maxwell (disambiguation)